The 2021 NCAA Division II Football Championship Game was a postseason college football game that determined a national champion in NCAA Division II for the 2021 season. It was played at McKinney ISD Stadium in McKinney, Texas, on December 18, 2021, with kickoff at 9:00 p.m. EST (8:00 p.m. local CST), and television coverage on ESPNU.

The championship featured the top-seeded Ferris State Bulldogs from the Great Lakes Intercollegiate Athletic Conference easily defeating the second-seed Valdosta State from the Gulf South Conference, 58–17. The win gave Ferris State their football program's first national championship.

Teams
The participants of the 2021 NCAA Division II Football Championship Game were the finalists of the 2021 Division II Playoffs, which began with four 7-team brackets to determine super region champions, who then qualified for the national semifinals. The 2021 game featured the winners of those national semifinal games: No. 2 seed Valdosta State and No. 1 seed Ferris State. This was the second meeting between the two teams. The first meeting was for the 2018 Championship game, which Valdosta State defeated Ferris State by two points, 49–47. This was Ferris State's second championship game appearance, and Valdosta State's fifth; the Blazers were 4–1 in previous appearances.

National semifinals
Super region champions were seeded 1 to 4 for the national semifinals.

Game summary

Statistics

References

Championship Game
NCAA Division II Football Championship Games
Ferris State Bulldogs football games
Valdosta State Blazers football games
American football competitions in Texas
NCAA Division II Football Championship Game
NCAA Division II Football Championship Game
McKinney, Texas
Sports in Collin County, Texas